Martina "Molly" Beck (born Martina Glagow; 21 September 1979 in Garmisch-Partenkirchen, West Germany) is a retired German biathlete. She now lives in Mittenwald in Bavaria. She was most successful in the 2002–03 season, when she was the first German to win the women's overall Biathlon World Cup. She is also a three-times world champion and three-times Olympic silver medalist.

She married the Austrian biathlete Günther Beck on 24 July 2008 and is now known as Martina Beck. She has one daughter named Hilde (born 1 April 2011).

Career
Beck's talent was discovered in fourth grade, when she beat out male competition up to three years older than herself in a cross-country skiing event. Her father, Martin Glagow, is a former army officer and ski technician: he waxed Martina's skis until the end of the 2004-05 season, and was also wax technician for the British biathlon team from 2000 until his retirement in 2011. Her father attributed her shooting ability to family inheritance: he had won multiple divisional shooting championships, and he noted that his father was also a good marksman.

She became a member of the German World Cup team in 2000, when she impressed by winning an event in her first year and even finished third in the mass start World Cup standings. Later, she became the first German biathlete to win the women's Biathlon World Cup in the 2002–03 season, alongside the pursuit World Cup; in 2005–06, she finished third in the overall standings and won the mass start standings. In 2007–08, she was the best biathlete in the individual discipline. As of 17 March 2008, she has won a total of 12 individual world cup events.

During the 2006 Winter Olympics in Turin, Beck won three silver medals: one in the sprint competition, one in the pursuit, and one in the relay. At world championships, she has won a total of eleven medals: she was World Champion thrice, in 2003 in the pursuit (together with Sandrine Bailly) and in 2007 and 2008 in the relay.

Beck retired from the sport after the 2009–10 season.

Achievements

 Winter Olympics:
 2006: 3 × Silver (Individual, Pursuit, Relay)
 2010: 1 × Bronze (Relay)
 Biathlon World Championships:
 2001: 1 × silver (mass start)
 2003: 1 × gold (pursuit), 1 × bronze (relay)
 2004: 1 × silver (pursuit), 2 × bronze (sprint, relay)
 2007: 1 × gold (relay), 1 × silver (mass start), 1 × bronze (individual)
 2008: 1 × gold (relay), 1 × silver (individual)
 Biathlon World Cup overall:
 1 × overall World Cup winner (2002/03), 1 × World Cup pursuit winner (2002/03), 1 × World Cup individual winner (2007/08)
 Biathlon World Cup victories:
 14 (as of: 7 December 2008)
 Holmenkollen ski festival victories
 Three (as of 2006) - 2003 (pursuit), 2004 (individual), and 2006 (sprint)

References

External links
 Official website 
 
 Fanclub 
 

1979 births
Living people
Sportspeople from Garmisch-Partenkirchen
Biathletes at the 2002 Winter Olympics
Biathletes at the 2006 Winter Olympics
Biathletes at the 2010 Winter Olympics
Olympic silver medalists for Germany
Olympic bronze medalists for Germany
German female biathletes
Holmenkollen Ski Festival winners
Olympic biathletes of Germany
Olympic medalists in biathlon
Biathlon World Championships medalists
Medalists at the 2010 Winter Olympics
Medalists at the 2006 Winter Olympics